The Air Up There is a 1994 American sports comedy film directed by Paul Michael Glaser and starring Kevin Bacon and Charles Gitonga Maina with Yolanda Vazquez as Sister Susan.

Plot
Jimmy Dolan is a college basketball assistant coach who wants to find a new star for his team since he believes this will get him a promotion to head coach at the school. He sees a home video of a prospect named Saleh and travels to Kenya to recruit him. Upon arriving in this country, Dolan finds himself confronted not only with the challenges of basketball but also with the challenges of adjusting to and learning how to live in the midst of a brand-new culture. Though Dolan is initially opposed by Saleh's father who is also the leader of the village, he later agrees to let his son play. Dolan and Saleh both teach each other life lessons before they take the court for one final game with everything on the line. One of the most dramatic scenes in the film involves the instruction of Saleh by Dolan regarding the "Jimmy Dolan Shake and Bake."

Cast

 Kevin Bacon as Jimmy Dolan, a college basketball coach
 Charles Gitonga Maina as Saleh, a basketball player from a village in Kenya
 Yolanda Vazquez as Sister Susan
 Winston Ntshona as Urudu
 Mabutho 'Kid' Sithole as Nyaga
 Sean McCann as Ray Fox
 Dennis Patrick as Father O'Hara
 Nigel Miguel as Halawi

Production
For scenes taking place in the United States, the film was shot in Toronto and Hamilton, Ontario, Canada. Copps Coliseum stood in for the University's arena. Scenes in Africa were shot in Kenya and Hoedspruit, South Africa.

Reception
The Air Up There received negative reviews from critics. The Austin Chronicle mentions its "timeworn formula" and "cultural imperialism".  The New York Times review points to a plot similar to several other Disney movies. The film holds a rating of 21% on Rotten Tomatoes from 28 reviews.

Year-end lists
 Dishonorable mention – John Hurley, Staten Island Advance

References

External links
 
 
 

1994 films
American sports comedy films
1990s English-language films
American basketball films
1990s sports comedy films
Films directed by Paul Michael Glaser
Films shot in Hamilton, Ontario
Films set in Kenya
Films shot in Kenya
Hollywood Pictures films
Interscope Communications films
PolyGram Filmed Entertainment films
Films scored by David Newman
1994 comedy films
1990s American films